Adam Garnet Jones is a Canadian filmmaker and screenwriter.

Personal life 
Of Cree and Métis ancestry, Jones grew up in Alberta and British Columbia. Battling suicidal impulses in his early teens as he came to terms with being gay, he recovered a sense of purpose by making short films and videos and attending the Gulf Islands Film and Television School, and subsequently moved to Toronto, Ontario to study film at Ryerson University. After graduating from Ryerson, his short film Cloudbreaker premiered at the 2006 Toronto International Film Festival, and he coordinated a youth film and video program for Toronto's Inside Out Film and Video Festival.

Career 
He subsequently made the short films A Small Thing, Wave a Red Flag and Liar, wrote an episode of the television series Cashing In, and was a writer and story editor on the television series Mohawk Girls.

His feature film debut, Fire Song, premiered at the 2015 Toronto International Film Festival. Fire Song went on to pick up Audience Choice awards at four film festivals, including the imagineNATIVE Film + Media Arts Festival.

Jones' second film, Great Great Great, premiered at the Canadian Filmmakers' Festival in March 2017, where it won three of the festival's top awards for Best Feature, Best Screenplay and Best Performance. Great Great Great was released theatrically that same year. At the 6th Canadian Screen Awards in 2018, Jones and Sarah Kolasky received a nomination for Best Original Screenplay.

In 2018 he published his first young adult novel, an adaptation of Fire Song. The novel was a finalist for the Burt Award for First Nations, Inuit and Métis Literature. In 2019, the novelization of Fire Song was chosen as the Bronze Medalist for Young Adult Fiction at the Independent Publisher Book Awards.

References

External links

Film directors from Alberta
Canadian television writers
First Nations filmmakers
LGBT film directors
Canadian LGBT screenwriters
LGBT First Nations people
Canadian gay writers
Cree people
Writers from Alberta
Writers from British Columbia
Toronto Metropolitan University alumni
Living people
First Nations screenwriters
21st-century Canadian novelists
Canadian male novelists
Canadian writers of young adult literature
First Nations novelists
Place of birth missing (living people)
Canadian LGBT novelists
Film directors from British Columbia
21st-century First Nations writers
Canadian male screenwriters
21st-century Canadian screenwriters
Canadian male television writers
Year of birth missing (living people)
21st-century Canadian LGBT people
Gay screenwriters
Gay novelists